"Houdini" is a song by American indie pop band Foster the People from their debut studio album Torches. Written by the group's frontman Mark Foster, the song was first released as a promotional single exclusively in the United Kingdom on April 1, 2011. The song was released as the album's fifth single on May 15, 2012. It is featured on the soundtracks for video games SSX and Sackboy: A Big Adventure and in the episode "Yes, Then Zero" of Gossip Girl. The song appeared in the 2012 film LOL. It also appeared in the TV shows Awkward and Suits.

Writing and recording
"Houdini" was written by the group's frontman Mark Foster while he was working as a commercial jingle writer at Mophonics. While showing his then-girlfriend the offices on a so-called "take-your-girlfriend-to-work-day", Foster demonstrated how he wrote songs, putting a simple drum beat and vocal sample together in 10 minutes. Four days later, he revisited the composition and began adding piano chords. Reflecting on the song, he described his then-girlfriend as a "good muse".

Live performances
The band performed "Houdini", as well as "Pumped Up Kicks", on Saturday Night Live on October 8, 2011, which was hosted by Ben Stiller. American saxophonist Kenny G guested on the performance of "Houdini". Foster the People performed the song on Late Show with David Letterman in October 27, 2011 along with "Pumped Up Kicks", "Helena Beat", "Call It What You Want", "Don't Stop (Color on the Walls)", "I Would Do Anything for You", "Miss You" and "Life on the Nickel".

Music video
The music video for "Houdini" premiered on YouTube on April 26, 2012, directed by Daniel Kwan and Daniel Scheinert. James Mackey guest stars as the paramedic.

Synopsis
The band (Mark Foster, Mark Pontius, Jacob Fink) is filming a music video in the studio when a lighting rig falls on them. A paramedic arrives and declares them dead. The video director is devastated. A crew member calls someone he knows, a fixer, to help. The fixer arrives and his assistants take over. The assistants, dressed completely in black, stand behind the band members and move their limbs. The video crew is doubtful, but after a change in lighting and background that effectively hides the assistants, they are convinced that the fixer's plan will work. Together, the assistants and crew prepare for the band's concert that evening. Electronic controls are added to the faces of the band members, and now the illusion that they are alive is complete. The concert is a huge success, and the music video ends with the crew members partying backstage in front of the lifeless bodies of the band.

Awards and nominations
This music video was nominated for the 55th Annual Grammy Awards award for Best Short Form Music Video.

Track listing
Digital download
 "Houdini" – 3:20

Personnel
Mark Foster – vocals, piano, synthesizer, percussion, programming
Gary Grant – trumpet
Mark Pontius – drums
Cubbie Fink – bass

Charts

Release history

References

2012 singles
Foster the People songs
Song recordings produced by Rich Costey
Columbia Records singles
2010 songs
Songs written by Mark Foster (singer)